Haroun, also called Fadhiweyn, and natively transliterated as Xarunta in Somali, was a government and headquarters of the Dervishes, headed by Faarax Mahmud Sugulle. According to Claude Edward Marjoribanks Dansey, the political officer in the British Somali Coast Protectorate consisted of 400 individuals. The capture of the haroun was regarded as conceivably resulting in the Sayyid's surrender. In the third expedition, major Paul Kenna was tasked "by every means" to find where the haroun is.

Background
The Darawiish haroun was preceded by the Darawiish legal court tariqa which existed among the Dhulbahante as early as 1895. "He acquired some notoriety by seditious preaching in Berbera in 1895, after which he returned to his tariga in Kob Faradod, in the Dolbahanta," according to the Official History of the operations in Somaliland 1901-1904.

The legal court Darawiish tariqa according to Douglas Jardine, was primarily engaged in settling legal disputes. This early Darawiish court tariqa was also described as friendly to the British government:

In Darawiish nomenclature, a person learned in the rulings, legal codes and stipulations of this early Darawiish court, was referred to as a muqaddim, which roughly translates as arbitrator.

The British newspaper Chester Courant, rehashing British intelligence reports, stated that the early Darawiish community existed as early as 1895 as a court of appeal community:

Demographics

Head of Haroun (government)

The head of the Haroun presided over the Darawiish government, and oversaw commerce, domestic and foreign affairs, as well as other Darawiish-related oversight. The head of the haroun, i.e. the head of the dervish government has been described in various sources, with Farah Mahamud Sugulle described as the head of the haroun during the 1890s and 1900s decades:
1895 - 1910: Faarax Maxamud Sugulle; was the head of the haroun during the 1890s and 1900s decades. He is described as head of the Haroun in an article by The Times of London in March 1910:

I am strengthening the Darud by the issue of over 200 rifles, and an attack on the Haroun under Omar Doreh, who is to take place of Farah Mahmud, is being organized

As head of the haroun, it was the norm to consult the Head of Haroun, Faarax Maxamuud Sugulle, for any important matter requiring decisions within the Darawiish. For example, upon the first military defeat suffered by Darawiish at the battle of Jidbaale in 1904, despite the presence of qusuusi, Faarax Maxamuud Sugulle was typically singled out to provide deliberation. However out of humility, he would defer to the deputy Head of Haroun, Carab Illaawe:

Henry Francis Battersby, in his 1914 book on the Darawiish, described Farah Sugulleh as "one of the biggest men" in the Darawiish.

Successors
Carab Illaawe; Illaawe was the person to whom Sugulle would refer to during decision making, as such making him deputy head of haroun.
Proposal of March 1910 Omer Doreh; Omer Doreh was in March planned to take the place of Farah Mahamud Sugulle, however, before he could take Sugulle's place as head of the haroun, in that month both Doreh and Sugulle defected from the dervishes in the Anjeel incident described below.

Sugulle family

The son of Faarax Maxamuud Sugulle, Jama, lived through the final decade of Dervish resistance to colonialism, and would continue to be influential in the Dervish realm upon the independence of Somalia in 1960. For example, upon Somalia's independence Jama revived the Darawiish heritage by becoming the founder as well as head executive of the Somali Dervish unit, and he also was the overseer of the widely publicised coronation of Garaad Abdiqani in 1985.

Since the advent of the federal era in Somalia, several police units modelled after the Somali Dervish unit created by Jama Sugulle have surfaced, including Galmudug Dervish, Hirshabelle Dervish, Jubaland Dervish etc.

According to Claude Edward Marjoribanks Dansey, Barni Maxamuud Sugulle, the sister of Faarax Maxamuud Sugulle and fifth wife of the Sayid, was the commander of Indhabadan, a 600 member Darawiish division with 400 spearmen and 200 riflemen of which half was composed of Naleeye Axmed subclan of Ugaadhyahan Dhulbahante and the other half Qayaad Dhulbahante:

According to Richard Corfield, Sugulle family member Abbane Mohamud Sugulle was likewise a commander in the Darawiish, particularly, the base at Haysimo, which according to British officer Dansey, was a base held by Burcadde-Godwein administrative division. The name of Cabbane Sugulle is misspelled as Abaim Sugulleh; he commanded the Burcadde-Godwein base together with Askar Doreh:

The following Mullah's headman are reported in the Warsangli “karias” at Haisamo:—Asker Doreh, Mijjertein, and Abaim Mahomed Suggulleh, Dolbahanta Ba Ararsama.

British intelligence reports further state that one of the Taargooye subdivisions was commanded by Badhiidh Sugulle.

History
In this meeting several senior members of the Daraawiish called for sedition in one way or another. Individuals who took part in this conspiracy include:
Haaji Hasan 'Awl, Darwiish governor
Abdalla Qoriyow, who was the Darwiish magistrate in Taleh
Ahmad Fiqi, who was a Darwiish theologian
Faarah Mahamuud Sugulle, who was head of the haroun and the wealthiest person in the Daraawiish 
'Abdalla Shihiri, who was a Darwiish envoy
Nur Hashi, who was a khusuusi

Three plans were put forth, including (a) killing the Sayyid and replacing him with a new leader, (b) replacing him without killing him, and (c) deserting the Darwiish en masse. At the end, the third plan was carried out.

Notification
The Sayyid was informed about the conspiracy by a man of the Jama Siyaad subclan called Shire Cumbaal, also spelled Shire Umbaal. The exact words spoken by Shire Cumbaal was:

Aftermath

Due to Shire Umbaal's defection from the seditious meeting, and the subsequent notification, the Daraawiish managed to capture many leading conspirators. Haan 'Awl was subsequently killed. Farah Mohamud Sugulle as the leader of Anjeel who sought to usurp the Sayyid's position had his father killed, although his own life was spared. Qoriyow was punished by the decision to have him demoted by stripping him of his previous position. Other figures had fled.  The Reer Khalaf, a Majeerteen subclan who had previously been of the Taargooye wing of Darwiish, joined the defectors. As such, they were decimated in retaliation. Confrontations between Darwiish defectors and persistent Darwiish endured for a couple of years, but among the most prominent of these confrontations was the Hadega battle in March 1910 wherein the defectors had been aided by the Issa Majeerteen tribe. Nonetheless, at Hadega, notable casualties occurred on both sides, with Darwiish leader Nur Hidig,  permanently debilitated from wounds sustained at this battle, with Nur Dolbas (Dhalbaas) and Adan Egal (Cigaal) dead on the defectors side and Darwiish leaders Shire Umbaal and Adam Maleh were dead on the Darwiish side, with Shire Umbaal later being described by Robert Crewe-Milnes as "a very important leader of the Dervishes".

Religion
Out of all the twenty-seven Dhulbahante garesas built by the Darawiish, not a single one of them had a mosque constructed within them, which according to some colonial officials placed doubt that there was any religious impulse behind Darawiishnimo.

Setting

The British parliament described the polity over which Diiriye Guure held regnancy as a "strong and stable native state"; and the only one that managed to militarily overcome British military power:

Norms

Chauvinism
The Darawiish were also chauvinistic with regards to themselves in juxtaposition to their European colonial counterparts, stating that pre-colonial Africa was superior to the arrival of colonial customs and norms . For example, a letter written in March 1909 states that pre-colonial life was good, whilst its aftermath brought seizures of the natives Darawiish property, unprecedented taxation and other ills:

Laws

Xeer
The two most common themes in the immediate post-Darawiish community of Haysimo regarding xeer laws were either which penalty ensues in cases of murder and marriage. Ali Dhuh was a poet who defected from the Darawiish and subsequently became a literary opponent. Since Dhuh hailed from the Ali Gheri clan of the Dhulbahante, with Ali Gheri being the clan whom founded the Darawiish, his diatribes held extra weight, and also highlighted protocol or cultural customs which appealed to Darawiish. In one of his poetic diatribes he vilifies the Sayyid for being a satyriasist and being incestual:

And you covet with fifteen women
Like a ram or sheep in heat
Being untiring of lust, a lecherous infidel
women veiled in shawls habitually visit him
verily, Rooha (the Sayid's sister) testified to just how lecherous her brother was

Nonetheless, the Darawiish considered explicitness and unequivocality to be preferable to prudishness, as with the line about Axmed Taajir in the poem Gaala-leged, wherein anatomically correct phraseology was used publicly and not considered as an expletive or profanity. Being referred to as "Axmed Taajir" meaning "Ahmed the penis beneficiary" in lyricisms which were promulgated around children, the elderly and throughout wider society shows that Darawiish perception of what constituted fahisha (lewdness) differed extensively from that of the Arab world which was far more prudish.

The Nur Ahmed were the Galool Oriye lineage whom hosted the Darawiish bases in Haysimo. Their view on marriage was that a girl's betrothal should only be controlled by her male relatives according to a 1946 las anod district letter which says "man of the Nuur Aḥmad marries a girl of the Nuur Aḥmad he shall pay damages valued at twenty camels to the girl's father. A man guilty of illicit relations with an unmarried girl shall pay five camels in compensation to her father." This also shows that the Darawiish clans viewed males as being in charge of the household, that marriage is among the most important institutions in society and that they did not see adultery as big as an issue as murder, with a rather low comparative penalty. Unlike the 21st century, wherein a woman accepting male dominance may be discredited with derogatory terms such as a pick-me girl, the female equivalent of simp, these series of post-Taleh-bombing laws show that women in Ciid-Nugaal were traditionally submissive towards the men in their households or accepting of patriarchy.

The verbal exchange between Ismail Ishaaq Urwayni and the Sayid in 1920 addresses the notion that during the medieval era, the ability to get married was limited for men of low socioeconomic status such as slaves:

Disarmament
The 1920 Dardaaran poem speaks about masculinity as with Afbakayle verse 37. In the Dardaaran verse the Sayid states that a race being forcibly disarmed is akin to emasculation. The following verse is about the Sayid making a prophecy wherein he correctly predicts the British ceding the Huwan to Ethiopia in 1948:

Oath-taking
The Maqashiiya uunka poem at times concerns itself with ancient customary practises like the mawaacidada (circle of vows) refer to an ancient Somali practise when taking oaths, like in Afbakayle verse 42:

Nativism
The Darawiish poem Dacwad Bann Ka Leeyahay, also called Ogadeen haa ii dirin, starts with berating the Ogaden clan saying that the Darawiish polity is at odds politically with the Ogaden. This was after a series of events whereby the Ogaden and Darawiish were raiding one another, and whereby the British consul Cordeaux states that he can't do anything about it as Ogaden was a Amhara subject rather than a British subject. The British counter-complained that the Darawiish had tergiversated the Warsangeli clan over to the Darawiish side. The next verses of the poem extolls nativism through clan relations:

The poem Mariyama shiikh asserts that the Darawiish have a fixed and assigned territory, akin to Afbakayle verses 32 and 44, by stating that those seeking to join Darawiish need to become muhajir (emigrant). It states that over the years, a thousand people had become emigrants in the Nugaal Valley and Ciid regions, the original habitat of Darawiish:

The term haddaan waayay literally means if I fell short and is throughout inundated with rhetorical questions asking whether the Darawiish were really defeated. As one of the Sayid's last poems of 1920 created after the Fall of Taleh, and thereby decisive defeat of Darawiish and gives a retrospect of his life work and that despite the Fall of Taleh, and that despite the fact that the majority of Somalis were dismissive or apathetic to anti-colonialism, he succeeded in displaying Darawiish courage and the resolute stance of Darawiish in the face of colonialism. The third line of the poem states that the Darawiish sought to establish the Nugaal Valley and Ciid regions as their definitive territory:

In the first and second lines of the poem Cali-Geri Aboodiga Ku Lalay the Sayid similarly confines the territorial delimitations of Darawiish to the 'Iid and Nugaal. In the 80th line of the poem Xuseenow Tabtaan Ahay, the Sayid likewise rejects the notion of a Somali identity, and even disparages the Somali identity as the antithesis of being Darawiish.

Among Darawiish, here was also nativism with regards to foreign consumer culture, with those wearing clothes associated with colonialists being castigated:

Darawiish rhetoric often makes links between being a xenophilic or xenocentric doormat and an infidel, as the following exchange recalls:

The Sayid replied as follows:

When the scramble for Africa reached Darawiish territories, the racial stratification professed by European colonialists wasn't limited to a binary suggesting a European supremacy over Africans; rather notes written by British colonial administrators professed a general Eurasian genetic determinist supremacy over the peoples of the African continent. For instance, a contemporary archeologist refused to believe that the native Darawiish constructed the long series of Dhulbahante garesa fortifications, instead attributing their buildings to Himyarites and Sabeans:

The offices of the official arm of the British army likewise had a condescending and patronizing view of native Darawiish and Horn Africans alike, attributing to them the sweeping label of Darawiish being an "uncivilised and comparatively unknown country". British general Malcolm McNeill who operated in the first two expeditions, likewise considered native Africans, as unsophisticated, stating the roads at Beretableh near Boocame were created by "the Phcenicians in some bygone age."

Military-administrative divisions

Major

In terms of military expertise, Golaweyne was most known for being over-represented during the early battles during the first two expeditions. Miinanle was best known for typically being in close proximity of the pastoral Darawiish supporting communities; as such, Miinanle was also typically at the front line whenever confronted with raiding parties from European colonial armed Somali clans such as Rayid, Koufur, Dhabayaco or Huwan. Since Shiikhyaale were the principal as well as the supreme division, any decisions made within the Shiikhyaale was pivotal, and would directly affect the other Darawiish divisions as well. The close proximity of Miinanle to the pastoral communities of Ciid-Nugaal also meant that Miinanle were probably the second wealthiest administrative division, after Shiikhyaale, due to tax-revenue generated.

Notes

Medium
The Taargooye subdivision was disbanded in 1910 upon the Anjeel incident after its constituent Majeerteen became mutinous, and was also known for its mechanical expertise. The Dharbash division was the westernmost Darawiish division and was regarded as among the most pious. The Indhabadan administrative division of Darawiish was regarded as having the most scouts. The servicemen of the Burcadde-godwein division was primarily tasked with coercion against neighbouring tribes.

Minor
The term Addoon is the Somali word for slave. It was a Darawiish administrative division which contracted people from low-caste clans and would elevate their status in order to assure loyalty. The Addoon division was also called Gaarhaye and was primarily composed of the Madhiban clan. This loyalty meant that they were entrusted to mingle with the most senior members of the haroun. As such, the main task of Gaarhaye (Adone) was to protect government members in the Haroun. Ragxun was the easternmost Darawiish administrative division. The Bah-udgoon was the southernmost Darawiish administrative division.

Subdivisions of divisions

Bah Ina Nur Hedik
Shiikhyaale was one of the divisions where conscript reserves could be attached; one such regiment was the Bah in Nur Hedik, which literally means, the group of Ina Nur Hedik, referring to Abdi Nur Hedik, often simplified to Nur Hedik; the commander of the entire Darawiish cavalry. The 12 May 1907 intelligence report from the British Aden Colony describing Nur Hedik as commander of the Darawiish cavalry is as follows:

In the post-Dervish period, Nur Hedik was the leader of DHulbahante in Erigabo. A 1910 intelligence report from the British Aden colony documenting a battle between Darawiish and native auxiliaries who were signatories to the Italians, Nur Hedik was described as one of three Darawiish commanders, alongside Adam Maleh and Shire Cumbaal:

The Times news sources states that Nur Hedik was shot through both his legs. On occasion, rumours were spread in the Dervish territories of 'Iid and Nugal that Nur Hedik, misspelled as Nur Nedik, had abandoned the Dervishes along with his cavalry, as reported by the British War Office, who refers to Nur Hedik as the overall commander of the Dervish cavalry.

The third person narrative using the native transliteration of Nuur Xiddig is used to describe Nur Hedik as a qusuusi, i.e. a counciller during a scaled back phase of anti-colonial resistance:

Nur Hedik, according to the British War Office report, initially controlled only his Ali Naleye subclan:

The Darawiish haroun, the name of the dervish government, was at Galo, near Halin, and Nur Hedik was one of the rare named visitors there:

During the fourth expedition, the only Dervish commander to be appended with their name in the official British documentation of the staff diary of H. E. Stanton was Nur Hedik; the following report about Nur Hedik was given prior to the Battle of Jidbali:

Others
British intelligence reports gave the following details on subdivisions of Darawiish administrative divisions:
Other subdivisions of Shiikhyaale besides "bah ina nur hedik" were "bah ina daib" and "bah ina islan" 
 "bah ina mullo" was a subdivision of Ragxun and was commanded by Cusmaan Boos.
Subdivisions of Garbo were "Bah Ina Ali Shire" and "bah ina Ali Ibrahim", commanded by Jaamac Cudur, of the Ali Gheri clan, and Nuurxaashi Cali Ibrahim, of the Warsangeli clan, with the latter subdivision being named after Nuurxaashi Cali.
A subdivision of Taargooye was "bah ina dorey", commanded by Badhiidh Sugulle, spelled in intelligence reports as "Badi Suguleh".
 Joofey Cali Jiriir, described in British sources as Jofi Ali Godi, was said by the British War Office to have commanded 800 men in 1903.

References

Nugal, Somalia
Individual trees
Political organisations based in Somalia
Defunct national legislatures
Chieftainships
Government agencies established in 1895
Government agencies disestablished in 1920